The crevice rainbow-skink (Lygisaurus rimula) is a species of skink found in Queensland in Australia.

References

Lygisaurus
Reptiles described in 1980
Skinks of Australia
Endemic fauna of Australia
Taxa named by Glen Joseph Ingram
Taxa named by Jeanette Covacevich
Taxobox binomials not recognized by IUCN